Tyler Cheese (born November 13, 1996) is an American professional basketball player for Estonian Rapla KK of the Latvian-Estonian Basketball League.

High school career
Cheese played three years at Albany High School and led the team to the Class AAAA state tournament as a junior. He transferred to Combine Academy in North Carolina. As a senior, Cheese averaged 17.3 points, 6.6 rebounds, and 5.2 assists per game while shooting 41 percent from behind the three-point arc, earning All-State recognition. In April 2016, he signed with Florida SouthWestern over Florida and Chipola.

College career
In his freshman season at Florida SouthWestern State College, Cheese averaged 10.6 points, 3.5 rebounds and two assists per game, earning Second Team All-Suncoast Conference honors. As a sophomore, he averaged 15.1 points, a team-high 6.6 assists and 5.3 rebounds per game and was named to the First Team All-Suncoast. Cheese scored a career-high 40 points against IMG Academy and recorded the first two triple-doubles in program history. He continued his career at NCAA Division I program Akron. On February 23, 2019, Cheese scored a junior season-high 27 points in a 70–58 win over Miami (Ohio). He averaged 11.1 points, 4.9 rebounds and 2.5 assists per game as a junior. On February 27, 2020, Cheese received a one-game suspension for bumping into an official in a game against Bowling Green. In his senior season, he averaged 15.7 points, 4.8 rebounds and 3.4 assists per game and earned Second Team All-Mid-American Conference honors.

Professional career
On July 8, 2020, Cheese signed his first professional contract with Universo Treviso of the Italian Lega Basket Serie A. He played three games averaging four points per game. On October 26, 2020, Cheese signed with Vilpas Vikings of the Korisliiga. After averaging seven points per game in four games, he requested to leave for personal reasons on November 18. On July 21, 2021, Cheese signed with Pelister of the Macedonian League. Later in 2021, he joined Team Ehingen Urspring of the German ProA.

Personal life
He is the son of Victoria Cheese and has a sister, Shyneshia, and a brother, Deron. His father died when he was five years old.

References

External links
Akron Zips bio
Florida SouthWestern Buccaneers bio

1996 births
Living people
Akron Zips men's basketball players
American expatriate basketball people in Finland
American expatriate basketball people in Germany
American expatriate basketball people in Italy
American men's basketball players
Basketball players from Georgia (U.S. state)
Shooting guards
Sportspeople from Albany, Georgia
Universo Treviso Basket players
American expatriate basketball people in Estonia